As a nickname, JJ, J.J., or J. J. may refer to:

In arts and entertainment 
 
 Justo Justo or JJ (1941–2012), Filipino columnist and news presenter
 J.J. Caucus, a character in the Doonesbury comic strip
 J. J. Abrams (born 1966), American media director and producer
 JJ Burnel (born 1952), Franco-English musician, singer-songwriter and producer
 JJ Cale (1938–2013), American singer-songwriter, recording artist and influential guitar stylist
 JJ Lin (born 1981), Singaporean mandopop singer-song writer, composer and actor
 JJ Olatunji (born 1993), English YouTube personality and rapper also known as KSI
 Jay-J (born 1969), American house music disc jockey
 Jennifer Herrema or JJ, American singer and songwriter with the band Royal Trux
 Junaid Jamshed or JJ (1964–2016), Pakistani recording artist and religious figure
 Justin Quinn or JJ, British singer known for his vocals on songs by UK garage duo DJ Luck & MC Neat
 Josie Totah or J. J. (born 2001), American actress

In sports 
 JJ Lehto (born 1966), Finnish motorsport racing driver
 J. J. Davis (born 1978), American baseball player
 J. J. Koski (born 1996), American football player
 J. J. Mann (born 1991), American basketball player
 J. J. Moses (born 1979), American football player
 J. J. Raterink (born 1981), American football player
 JJ Redick (born 1984), American basketball player
 J. J. Russell (born 1998), American football player
 J. J. Syvrud (born 1977), American football player
 J. J. Taylor (born 1998), American football player
 J. J. Watt (born 1989),  American football defensive end for the Houston Texans of the National Football League (NFL)
 J. J. Williams (born 1948), retired Welsh rugby union player
 J. J. Yeley (born 1976), American NASCAR driver
 Jermaine Jenas (born 1983) retired English professional footballer
 Jimmie Johnson (born 1975), American Indycar driver

In other fields 

 Robert Jay (judge) (born 1959), noted in court reports as "Jay J."
 Jonathan "JJ" Johnson, American businessman and politician from Utah
 J. J. Thomson (1856–1940), English physicist
 J. J. Valberg (1936), British-American philosopher
 J.J. Webster (1898–1965), American politician

See also 

Lists of people by nickname